Acanthodica daunus is a moth of the family Noctuidae. It is found in Mexico south to Costa Rica.

Catocalina
Moths of Central America
Moths described in 1894